Yang Joon-A (born June 13, 1989) is a South Korean football player playing for Gimpo FC in K-League 2

External links
 

1989 births
Living people
Association football fullbacks
South Korean footballers
Suwon Samsung Bluewings players
Jeju United FC players
Jeonnam Dragons players
Gimcheon Sangmu FC players
Incheon United FC players
K League 1 players
K League 2 players
Yang Joon-a